Howland is an extinct town in Putnam County, in the U.S. state of Missouri. The GNIS classifies it as a populated place.

Howland was platted in 1873.  A post office called Howland was established in 1873, and remained in operation until 1932. It is unknown why the name "Howland" was applied to this community.

References

Ghost towns in Missouri
Former populated places in Putnam County, Missouri